Kurakhsky District is an administrative and municipal district (raion), one of the forty-one in the Republic of Dagestan, Russia. It is located in the south of the republic. Its administrative center is the rural locality (a selo) of Kurakh. As of the 2010 Census, the total population of the district was 15,434, with the population of Kurakh accounting for 21.0% of that number.

Administrative and municipal status
Within the framework of administrative divisions, Kurakhsky District is one of the forty-one in the Republic of Dagestan. The district is divided into nine selsoviets which comprise twenty-eight rural localities. As a municipal division, the district is incorporated as Kurakhsky Municipal District. Its nine selsoviets are incorporated as fourteen rural settlements within the municipal district. The selo of Kurakh serves as the administrative center of both the administrative and municipal district.

References

Notes

Sources

Districts of Dagestan
